Anheh (also Romanized as Ānheh; also known as Aneh) is a village in Bala Larijan Rural District, Larijan District, Amol County, Mazandaran Province, Iran. At the 2006 census, its population was 73, in 19 families.

References 

Populated places in Amol County